Tommy Oliver was a former Australian professional soccer player who played as a defender for NSW club Weston and the Australia national soccer team.

Early life
Tommy Oliver moved to Newcastle, New South Wales around the time of World War I.

International career
Oliver began his undefeated international career with Australia playing in left-back position against Canada in a 3–2 win on 7 June 1924. He played his next match against Canada in a right-back position in a 4–1 win. He made two further appearances against Canada in a 0–0 draw and a 1–0 win.

Career statistics

International

References

Australian soccer players
Association football defenders
Australia international soccer players